The Howling Stones (1997) is a science fiction novel by American writer Alan Dean Foster.

Plot summary
Two scientists race against their vicious alien nemesis, the AAnn, to secure a treaty for mining rights on the newly discovered planet Senisran, an oddity of mostly ocean dotted with thousands of islands. The aboriginal natives' sacred stones are found to have an immense power that the humans and the AAnn will do almost anything to obtain.

External links

Alan Dean Foster homepage

1997 American novels
American science fiction novels
Humanx Commonwealth
Novels by Alan Dean Foster
1997 science fiction novels
Del Rey books
Fiction set on ocean planets